is a Japanese manga series written and illustrated by Tatsuki Fujimoto. It was serialized through Shueisha's Shōnen Jump+ website from April 2016 to January 2018, with its chapters collected in eight tankōbon volumes. In North America, Viz Media licensed the manga for English release.

Fire Punch takes place on an Earth that has become frozen over and barren. The protagonist Agni is a boy who has the blessing of regeneration. After his village succumbs to inextinguishable flames he is left constantly on fire, leaving him in anguish and vowing to get revenge.

Plot

Fire Punch takes place on an Earth that has become frozen over and barren, purportedly at the hands of a being known as the Ice Witch. The witch is among a few who possess special abilities known as "blessings". The protagonist Agni is a boy who has the blessing of regeneration, along with his sister Luna. They help the few elders in the village subsist on the meat of Agni's severed arms. One day, their village is visited by a blessed named Doma who offers to take Agni to his city of Behemdorg. Doma, disgusted at their practice of cannibalism, immolates the inhabitants with his inextinguishable flames. Luna, whose regeneration is slower, also succumbs, but not before imploring Agni to "live".

Constantly on fire, Agni's body breaks down and regenerates, leaving him in anguish. Over eight years, he is able to control his body again, vowing to get revenge on Doma. Agni comes across a convoy of slaves to Behemdorg and kills the soldiers. A boy named Sun, who thinks Agni is a god, follows him. Later, more soldiers find Agni, and one of them, Judah, a blessed resembling Luna, beheads him. They take him to Behemdorg, and Sun is tied up and made to generate electricity for the city. A repentant Doma asks Agni for forgiveness, but does not allow Agni to kill him.

Judah decides to try to kill the seemingly immortal Agni by throwing his severed head into the ocean, taking a train there. Also on the train is Togata, another regenerative blessed, and twisted cinephile who has taken an interest in Agni, aiming to make him the subject of a film as director. Togata kills all the Behemdorg soldiers on the train, saving a girl named Neneto from being raped and making her camerawoman. Agni agrees to let Togata film his revenge on Doma in exchange for training.

At Behemdorg, Agni decides to free the slaves. While fighting Behemdorg's blessed, Agni's flames burn the city down, killing the residents. Agni defeats the blessed and the slaves are transported by an ally. Judah, no longer needing to maintain a facade of divine revelation, sets herself on fire using Agni's flames, but is stopped when the Ice Witch beheads her.

Publication
Fire Punch, written and illustrated by Tatsuki Fujimoto, was published on Shueisha's Shōnen Jump+ website from April 18, 2016, to January 1, 2018. Shueisha collected its chapters in eight tankōbon volumes, released from July 4, 2016, to February 2, 2018.

In North America, Viz Media announced that they licensed the manga for English release in January 2018. The eight volumes were published under the VIZ Signature Imprint from January 16, 2018, to October 15, 2019.

Volume list

Reception
In 2017, Fire Punch was nominated for the 10th Manga Taishō. The series ranked #15 on the "Nationwide Bookstore Employees' Recommended Comics of 2017" poll by Honya Club online bookstore. The 2017 edition of Takarajimasha's Kono Manga ga Sugoi! guidebook listed the series at #3 on its list of manga for male readers.

References

Further reading

External links
 

2016 webcomic debuts
Anime and manga about revenge
Cannibalism in fiction
Dark fantasy anime and manga
Dystopian anime and manga
Japanese webcomics
Shōnen manga
Shueisha manga
Supernatural thriller anime and manga
Transgender in anime and manga
Viz Media manga
Webcomics in print